Fellows of Royal Society elected in 1940.

Fellows 

 William Thomas Astbury
 Sir Gavin de Beer
 Oliver Meredith Boone Bulman
 John Cadman, 1st Baron Cadman
 Gilbert Cook
 Harold Davenport
 Sir Charles F. Goodeve
 Frederick Gugenheim Gregory
 Sir Alister Hardy
 Charles Halliley Kellaway
 Sir Kariamanickam Srinivasa Krishnan
 Sir Reginald Patrick Linstead
 Otto Maass
 Sir Harrie Massey
 Sir Bryan Matthews
 William Harold Pearsall
 Juda Hirsch Quastel
 Andrew Robertson
 Leonard Frank Spath
 Willie Sucksmith

Foreign members 

 Maurice de Broglie
 Ross Granville Harrison
 Gilbert Newton Lewis
 Francis Peyton Rous

References 

1940
1940 in science
1940 in the United Kingdom